List of journalists killed in Yemen includes nine journalists listed as confirmed since 1992 by Committee to Protect Journalists. Three media workers are also confirmed killed, as well as two more journalists still under investigation by the press freedom organization.

While covering the struggles between Houthi militias and Saudi Arabian forces there have been multiple journalists who have lost their lives in 2015. Among these, many were casualties resulting of bombings by Saudi Arabian forces targeting Houthi bases.

Journalists killed prior to 2011
 Muhammad al-Rabou'e was murdered February 13, 2010 in Hajjah province, Yemen

Journalists killed since the Arab Spring Uprising in Yemen
In September 2014, Houthi rebels captured the capital of Yemen, Sana'a. This forced the Yemeni government to flee the city and relinquish their power. The two places where journalists have been killed in Yemen in 2015, are both Houthi occupied locations. There have been airstrikes and bombing by Saudi Arabian military in an attempt to weaken Houthis; however these have resulted in many deaths, including most of the above journalists.

Reactions 
Abdel Karim al-Khaiwani
“I condemn the murder of Abdul Karim Mohammed al-Khaiwani, a dedicated journalist of outstanding integrity,” the Director-General said. “His death is a loss to the people of Yemen and the quest for informed reporting and debate. Mr al-Khaiwani’s killers must be brought to trial as quickly as possible.” – Irina Bokova, Director General of UNESCO.

Mohamed Shamsan
“In the present conflict in Yemen, the deaths of journalist Mohammed Rajah Shamsan, and his fellow Yemen Today employees Monir Aklan, Hazzam Mohamed Zeid and Amin Yehia, is a loss for society as a whole, as civilians depend on the media to provide them with information that is vital for their safety. I call on all parties to respect fully the civilian status of media workers, in keeping with the Geneva Conventions” – Irina Bokova, Director General of UNESCO.

Bilal Sharaf al-Deen
“We hold the coalition responsible for the death of our colleague who died in a bombing  that was targeting a residential neighborhood yesterday evening in the city of Sanaa” – International Federation of Journalists.

Almigdad Mojalli
“I condemn the death of Almigdad Mojalli. I call on all parties to make sure that journalists are able to carry out their work in the safest possible conditions, in keeping with the Genevan Conventions and UN Security Council Resolution 2222, which was adopted last year to improve the safety of journalists in conflict situations.” – Irina Bokova, Director General of UNESCO.

Hashem al-Hamran
“I condemn the killing of Hashem Al Hamran. His death highlights the imperative need to improve the security of media professionals in all circumstances. The free flow of information is important for any society. It becomes truly vital for civilians living with the hardship of conflict.” – Irina Bokova, Director General of UNESCO.

Ahmed al-Shaibani
“I condemn the murder of Ahmed Al-Shaibani. Targeting press workers in conflict situations is a war crime under international law. It also deprives civilians of vital information they need to cope with the difficulties of war and undermines informed public debate which is so important to help restore peace and stability.” – Irina Bokova, Director General of UNESCO.

See also 
Media of Yemen
Yemeni Revolution
Houthis
Arab Spring

References 

Yemeni journalists
Yem
Lists of journalists killed
Journalists killed while covering military conflicts